The Rhine-Main-Universities (RMU), in German Rhein-Main-Universititäten, is a strategic alliance of the Johannes Gutenberg University Mainz, Johann Wolfgang Goethe-University Frankfurt am Main and Technische Universität Darmstadt.

Study and Teaching 
The cooperation courses introduced by the RMU and the RMU study programme are unique in Germany. The cooperative study programmes are study programmes offered by two of the partner universities and consist of courses at both universities. This results in study programmes that could not have been offered previously by the universities alone. The students are then enrolled at both universities. The RMU study programme is an extension of an independent study programme and is intended to allow students from the universities to take part in courses at other universities. Credit points will also be credited. For this purpose, students will be enrolled at all universities.

Research 
The RMU alliance comprises about 30 joint research groups and networks (March 2020). To promote joint research projects the RMU universities have set up the RMU Initiative Fund for Research for joint research. The RMU Initiative Fund supports projects in two funding lines. Funding line I serves to support already established collaborative research projects. Funding line II serves to initiate collaborative projects.

Short overview 
Numbers to the alliance are:

 102,800 students (winter semester 2019/20)
 15,600 graduates (winter semester 2018/19)
 1,700 doctorates (winter semester 2018/19)
 22 non-university research institutions (2019)
 526 million euros in third-party funding (2018)
 21 Collaborative Research Centres (2019)
 14 DFG Graduate schools (2019)
 41 ERC grants (2019)

References 

College and university associations and consortia in Europe
Technische Universität Darmstadt
Goethe University Frankfurt
Johannes Gutenberg University Mainz